Adair-Kennedy Memorial Park is a sports facility complex in Juneau, Alaska, and adjacent to Floyd Dryden Middle School.  It was named after Richard James Adair and Jimmy Earl Kennedy, two Juneau Police Department officers who died in the line of duty on April 17, 1979.

The park amenities include a baseball field, football/soccer field, track and a climbing structure.

The City and Borough of Juneau plans to make many changes to the park.

References

External links
 City and Borough of Juneau Parks and Recreation

American football venues in Alaska
Athletics (track and field) venues in Alaska
Baseball venues in Alaska
Buildings and structures in Juneau, Alaska
Law enforcement memorials
Monuments and memorials in Alaska
Parks in Alaska
Protected areas of Juneau, Alaska
Soccer venues in Alaska